Payola is a legal term for a payment or fund.

Payola may also refer to:

Payolas, a Canadian rock band
Payola (New Zealand band)  
Payola (Northern Irish band) 
Payola (The Cribs album), 2013
Payola (Desaparecidos album), 2015